The Eturerveyem (Russian: Этурэрвейэм) is a river located in the Chukotka Peninsula in Far East Siberia, Russia. It is flowing into the Kolyuchin Bay. It roughly 75 kilometres long.

Rivers of Chukotka Autonomous Okrug